The Warehouse District is a major downtown district in Raleigh, North Carolina, The Warehouse District is a growing arts, restaurant, nightlife, and entrepreneurial district located three blocks west of the Raleigh Convention Center. The district consists of six blocks of spacious red-brick buildings, most of which are re-purposed warehouses, factories and depots.

History 
The Warehouse District was built initially as an industrial zone due to its proximity to the rail lines several blocks West of downtown Raleigh. The warehouse, depot, and factory buildings fell out of use in the mid 1950s. Many of the buildings were in a state of disrepair by the late 1970s and early 1980s when artists, designers, and performers began making use of the spaces again, including a young David Sedaris. By the late 1980s much of the district had found use as galleries, studio space, poetry reading space, and woodworking shop. Nightlife venues came to the district in the form of The Berkley and the Capital Coral, Culture Club, and Fallout Shelter in the mid to late 1980s.

Today the Warehouse District is home to a number of restaurants in addition to nightlife and art venues, including the legendary The Pit BBQ restaurant. The district now features several craft beer establishments including Crank Arm Brewing, Boylan Street Brewpub, Tasty beverage Company, and Brewmasters Bar & Grill.

The 2010s are seeing a surge of business growth in the district, with the largest move by Citrix who will open a 550-employee division headquarters in the former Dillon Supply building in 2014. HQ Raleigh, a co-working space with 45 businesses, announced in 2013 it is moving to the Warehouse District. Local business leaders have said the district is, 'starting to create an entrepreneurial reputation."

Attractions

Eat and Drink 
 The Morgan Street Food Hall
 Parkside Restaurant
 The Pit
 Tuscan Blu
 Five Star
 Crank Arm Brewing
 Humble Pie
 Jose and Sons
 The Flying Saucer
 The District Raleigh
 Boylan Bridge Brewpub
 Moonlight Pizza
 Fiction Kitchen

Art 
 Antfarm Studios
 Designbox
 Litmus Gallery
 William-Cozart
 311 Gallery & Studios (311 West Martin Street Gallery & Studios was originally opened by Bob Coster and Jason Craighead as Glance Gallery, and re-named by Tom and Judy Jones in 2007, when they repurposed the space with a number of studios for working artists, as well as a curated gallery featuring outside artists.  In 2013 the business was acquired by Carol Joy Shannon, a painter who had had a studio in the space since 2008. Shannon added more studios and a gift shop and the gallery now functions as part of the vibrant art scene on Martin Street. As of 2021 Shannon is no longer an owner or affiliated with the gallery. However, it continues to be an integral part of the local art scene.
 Rebus Works & PH Seven
 Dovetail Woodworks The gallery and frame shop of Anthony Ulinski, a well-regarded local painter.)
 CAM: Contemporary Art Museum
 Visual Art Exchange (VAE is the premier arts incubator in the Raleigh area, with opportunities for artists of all genres and levels to exhibit work in juried and non-juried shows, attend classes and critiques, participate in SparkCON and IGNITE, and network with the other 1000 members who make use of this unique organization.) As of 2020 VAE is no longer located in the Warehouse district.
 Flanders Gallery
 Tipping Paint Gallery (Tipping Paint Gallery is a "gallery-within-a-gallery" inside 311 West Martin St Gallery & Studios.  Tipping Paint was started by 7 artists of different genres who left another location to open their own space on McDowell Street next to Poole's Diner.  Two years later, they moved into 311 West Martin Street, when the new owner built them a large space in the back.  They show their own work, rotating monthly, as well as hosting juried shows and fund-raisers.) Tipping Paint has since disbanded and they are no longer housed within 311 Gallery.

Nightlife 
 Parkside Cafe
 The District Raleigh
 Legends Nightclub
 Deep South Bar
 Spy
 Ugly Monkey
 313 (Now named Caza, Moved to Hillsborough street, Raleigh NC. 
 Bodi
 Boxcar Bar+Arcade

Retail 
 Tasty Beverage Company
 Videri Chocolate Factory
 Raleigh Denim Workshop + Curatory
 Goodwill
 The Saturday Market
 Boyette's Automotive Performance Machine Shop - Opened in 1949

Events 
 'CueGrass Festival - Annual BBQ, beer, and bluegrass festival held in the Warehouse District.
 First Friday Gallery Walk - Gallery crawl held the first Friday evening of each month.

Gallery

References

External links
 raleighwarehousedistrict.com
 www.boyettesmachineshop.com

Neighborhoods in Raleigh, North Carolina
Shopping malls in Raleigh, North Carolina
Transportation in Raleigh, North Carolina